Atimiola rickstanleyi is a species of beetle in the family Cerambycidae. It was described by Lingafelter and Nearns in 2007. It is known from the Dominican Republic.

References

Desmiphorini
Beetles described in 2007